The 1920–21 Navy Midshipmen men's basketball team represented the United States Naval Academy in intercollegiate basketball during the 1920–21 season. The head coach was Billy Lush, coaching his third season with the Midshipmen.

Schedule

|-

References

Navy Midshipmen men's basketball seasons
Navy